The Yuzuan yizong jinjian is a Chinese medical compendium published in 1742 AD, during the Qing dynasty. Described as "one of the best treatises on general medicine of modern times", it was a project sanctioned by the Qianlong Emperor and published by the Imperial Printing Office.

Contents
The text is divided into ninety juan or volumes: seventy-four volumes pertain to internal medicine, while the remaining sixteen concern general surgery. More than a quarter of the text reproduces, with added commentary, two parts of an earlier work written by Zhang Zhongjing, the Shanghan zabing lun (Treatise on Cold Damage and Miscellaneous Disorders); Zhang's work is presented by the authors of the Yuzuan yizong jinjian as foundational to Chinese medical orthodoxy.

It also contains what is "probably the largest ensemble of illustrations in a single Chinese medical text", with some 484 such depictions of the human body, ranging from images of children's hands to a "one-page array of 24 anuses". Depictions of smallpox—a disease that was especially deadly to the ruling Manchurians—are particularly prominent and detailed.

Publication history
An initiative of the Qianlong Emperor that was announced on 17 December 1739, the Yuzuan yizong jinjian was published in 1742 by the Imperial Printing Office, which designated it as a national textbook. The text had some eighty contributors, including thirty-nine members of the Imperial Academy of Medicine, most of whom came from the Jiangnan region, specifically the southern provinces of Anhui, Jiangsu, and Zhejiang. Imperial Physicians Wu Qian and Liu Yuduo served as editors-in-chief, under the supervision of Manchu official Ortai.

Legacy
The Yuzuan yizong jinjian has been noted for "its breadth, editorial accuracy, medical coverage, and use of mnemonic rhymes". Moreover, it has "attained the status of a canonical medical classic which, even today, remains obligatory reading for scholars and practitioners of traditional Chinese medicine." K. Chimin Wong and Liande Wu, writing in the History of Chinese Medicine (1973), describe the text as "one of the best treatises on general medicine of modern times."

Notes

References

Citations

Bibliography

 
 
 
 
 
 
 
 

Chinese medical texts
18th-century books
History of ancient medicine